Mary Corleone is a fictional character in The Godfather Part III, portrayed by Sofia Coppola. She is the daughter of Michael Corleone and Kay Adams and sister of Anthony Vito Corleone.

The Godfather Part II
Mary first appears in The Godfather Part II as the younger child of Michael and Kay. She is a young child (aged about 4 or 5) in the late 1950s. Like her brother Anthony, Mary does not have a significant role or story arc in the film.

The Godfather Part III
Mary is sheltered from the violent world of the Corleone crime family. She falls in love with her cousin, Vincent Mancini, Sonny Corleone's illegitimate son. While the family is traveling in Sicily, Michael tells Mary he disapproves of the romance, believing that Vincent's growing involvement in the "family business" puts her life in danger.  He fears that Mary could suffer the same fate as his first wife, Apollonia, who was killed by a car bomb intended for him 30 years earlier.

Toward the end of the film, Michael names Vincent as his successor, on condition that he break off his relationship with Mary. After her brother's debut concert, the assassin Mosca tries to kill Michael. One bullet grazes Michael's shoulder, but the other accidentally hits Mary in the torso, fatally wounding her. Michael is devastated by Mary's death, and screams in torment while cradling her dead body.

Casting
Sofia Coppola, the daughter of director Francis Ford Coppola, was cast in the role of Mary Corleone after several choices dropped out: Winona Ryder discontinued her involvement with the film due to nervous exhaustion, Julia Roberts due to scheduling conflicts, and Madonna was deemed too old for the part by some. Rebecca Schaeffer had earlier pursued the role but had been murdered by a deranged fan. It has been suggested that the situation further damaged Francis Ford Coppola's career and ruined Sofia's before it had even begun. Coppola has said that she never really wanted to act, and only appeared in the film as a favor to her father. 

After filming, Sofia Coppola confirmed that she did not want to enter acting. It has also been suggested that Sofia's role in the film may have contributed to its box office performance, which started strongly and then went into decline. Coppola has said that her father based a lot of her character on her while writing the script, before she was even cast into the role.  Sofia had herself worried that she had only been given the role because she was the director's daughter, and the role placed a strain on her during the time of shooting that her mother observed in a series of diaries she wrote for Vogue during the filming.

After she was critically panned for her performance in The Godfather Part III, for which she won Worst Supporting Actress and Worst New Star at the 1990 Golden Raspberry Awards, Coppola ended her acting career, although she appeared in the independent film Inside Monkey Zetterland (1992), as well as in the backgrounds of films by her friends and family: for example, she appeared as Saché, one of Queen Padmé Amidala's five handmaidens in George Lucas' Star Wars: Episode I – The Phantom Menace (1999). Coppola has since been quoted as saying that she was not hurt by the criticism from her role in The Godfather Part III, because she never especially wanted an acting career.

Sequel novels
Mary appears as a minor character in Mark Winegardner's sequel novels The Godfather Returns and The Godfather's Revenge, although in the original novel, Michael's second child is a boy.

Family
Michael Corleone—Father; played by Al Pacino
Kay Adams—Mother; played by Diane Keaton
Anthony Vito Corleone—Brother; played by Anthony Gounaris in Godfather I, played by James Gounaris in Godfather II, played by Franc D'Ambrosio in Godfather III
Vito Corleone—Grandfather; played by Marlon Brando and Robert De Niro
Carmela Corleone—Grandmother; played by Morgana King and Francesca De Sapio
Santino 'Sonny' Corleone—Uncle; played by James Caan
Fredo Corleone—Uncle; played by John Cazale
Constanzia "Connie" Corleone-Rizzi—Aunt; played by Talia Shire
Vincent Mancini-Corleone—First cousin; son of Sonny Corleone played by Andy García
Frank Corleone—Cousin; son of Sonny Corleone
Kathryn & Francesca Corleone—Cousins; Sonny's twin daughters
Santino Corleone, Jr.—Cousin; son of Sonny Corleone

References

Corleone, Mary
Fictional murdered people
Corleone, Mary
Film characters introduced in 1974
Fictional Italian American people
Characters in American novels of the 21st century
Fictional characters involved in incest
Female characters in literature
Female characters in film
Cultural depictions of the Mafia